The following is a timeline of the history of the Netherlands' municipality of Groningen.

Pre–19th century 

 48 CE: Roman camp established.
 800: Martin's Church built (approximate date).
 1040: "Villa Cruoninga" ("Groningen") mentioned.
 13th century: Reitdiep canal dug
 : Martin's Church rebuilt in brick
 1255: City wall built
 1284: Groningen joins the Hanseatic League
 : Town hall built
 1308: Jacobijnerklooster established
 1482: Martin's Church tower built
 1493: Der Aa Church built
 1506: Edzard I, Count of East Frisia, in power
 1509: Ommelanderhuis and Rechthuis built
 1526: Guild unrest
 1575: Ommelanden secedes from city
 1579: City signs Union of Utrecht regional treaty
 1580: Siege of Groningen; Spaniards in power
 May–July 1594: Siege of Groningen; Maurice, Prince of Orange, and William Louis, Count of Nassau-Dillenburg, in power; Groningen Treaty of Reduction unites city and Ommelanden
 17 February 1595: City of Groningen and the Ommelanden admitted to the Republic of the United Netherlands
 1599: orphanage founded.
 : workhouse established
 1614: University of Groningen founded
 1615: University library established
 1635: Goudkantoor built on the Grote Markt
 1650: William Frederick, Prince of Nassau-Dietz, becomes stadtholder of Groningen
 1659: Gerhard ten Berge becomes mayor
 1662: City Weigh House built
 July–August 1672: Siege of Groningen by Bishop Christoph Bernhard von Galen of Münster on behalf of Louis XIV of France
 1705: Allert Meijer becomes city architect
 1728: Collegium Medicum founded
 1747: Jodenkamp cemetery established
 1756: Volteringstraat synagogue built
 1790: Henri Daniel Guyot Institute for the deaf established
 1798: Hotel De Doelen established

19th century 
 1801: Scientific Society of Groningen formed
 1810: City Hall rebuilt
 1811: Groningen becomes part of the Ems-Occidental department of the French Empire
 1813: French military ousted
 1815: Vindicat atque Polit established
 1819: design of Coat of arms of Groningen adopted
 1824: Jean François van Iddekinge becomes mayor
 1830: Academy of Fine Arts established
 1837: annual Groningsche Volksalmanak begins publication
 1841: Hoofdwacht on the Grote Markt in use
 1847: Praedinius Gymnasium active
 1865: Noord-Willems Canal dug
 1865: Korenbeurs rebuilt
 1866: population: 36,852
 1868: Nieuwe Groninger Nieuwsblad begins publication
 1870: Meppel–Groningen railway begins operations
 1874: Groninger Museum established
 1874: Fortress demolished
 1876: Eems Canal dug
 1879: Verbindingskanaal dug
 1879: design of the Flag of Groningen adopted
 1880: Horse-drawn tram begins operating
 1881: Scholtenhuis built
 1882: Groningen State Archives established
 1883: Groningen City Theatre established
 1884: Groningen–Delfzijl railway begins operating; Groningen Noord railway station opens
 1887: Groningen Local Railway Company established
 1888: Nieuwsblad van het Noorden begins publication
 1888: Hooghoudt distillery established
 1894: Peace society formed
 1895: Broerkerk demolished; Catholic St. Martinuskerk built
 1896: Groningen railway station built

20th century 
 1903: World exhibit held
 1904: Huis de Beurs café built
 1906: Gemeentetram Groningen transit entity established
 1906: Groningen Synagogue built
 1909: University Academics Facility built
 1910: electric tram begins operating
 1918: De Ploeg art group formed
 1919: Gorecht Canal dug
 1919: population: 89,030
 1929: Grand Theatre built
 1931: Hakenkampsveld Airport established outside city limits
 1933: Oosterpark Stadion opens
 26 July 1940: mistakenly bombarded by Allied forces
 26–27 September 1941: mistakenly bombarded by Allied forces
 April 1945: Battle of Groningen
 1946: Groningen chess tournament held
 1950: Design of the Flag of Groningen adopted
 1951: Jan Tuin becomes mayor
 1955: Roman Catholic Diocese of Groningen established
 1959: Groningen gas field discovered
 1960: Camera Cinema opens
 1962: Nieuwe Stadhuis built
 1969: increase in municipality size
 1969: Lauwers Lake created near city
 1970: Zernikecomplex development begins
 1971: Football Club Groningen established
 1971: Harm Buiter becomes mayor
 1973: Eemshaven seaport opens
 1974: Groningen Noord railway station rebuilt
 1977: Groningen traffic circulation plan implemented
 1979: RKZ Cinema opens
 1986: Hanze University of Applied Sciences established
 1991: Muller restaurant established
 1991: Hans Ouwerkerk becomes mayor
 1992: Groninger Dagblad begins publication
 1992: Groninger Kredietbank scandal
 1992: Groningen Audio Visual Archive established
 1993: European Association for Sport Management headquartered in Groningen
 1996: New City Hall building demolished
 1996: Eurosonic Festival commences
 1998: Jacques Wallage becomes mayor
 1998: Urban renewal efforts

21st century 
 2002: Dagblad van het Noorden founded
 2002: Groninger Archives established
 2004: Nederlands Stripmuseum established
 2005: University Medical Center Groningen established
 2006: Euroborg stadium established
 2007: Groningen Europapark railway station begins operating
 2011: construction on the Groninger Forum begins
 2014: Infoversum cinema built
 2014: population: 197,823
 2015: Peter den Oudsten becomes mayor.

See also 
 History of Groningen

Footnotes

Bibliography 

 
 
 
 
 
 
 
 
  1852-1857
  (province and city)
 
 

History of Groningen (city)
Groningen